An eponym is a person (real or fictitious) from whom something is said to take its name.  The word is back-formed from "eponymous", from the Greek "eponymos" meaning "giving name".

Here is a list of eponyms:

A 
 Shinzō Abe, Japanese Prime Minister – Abenomics
 Niels Henrik Abel, Norwegian mathematician – Abelian group, Abel's theorem, Abel–Ruffini theorem
 Helmut Abt, German-born American astrophysicist - Abt's star (SV Crateris/ β 600/ ADS 8115/ HD 98088, in the constellation Crater)
 Acantha, Greek mythological character – the plant genus Acanthus
 Achaemenes, Persian king – Achaemenid dynasty
 Achilles, Greek mythological character – Achilles' heel, Achilles tendon
 Ada Lovelace, first person to describe computer programming (for the Babbage engine) – Ada programming language
 Adam, Biblical character – Adam's apple, adamite
 Alvin Adams, American businessman – Adams Express
 Adamson, Swedish comics character – Adamson Award
 Thomas Addison, British physician – Addison's disease, Addisonian crisis, Addison–Schilder syndrome
 Adelaide of Saxe-Meiningen, British queen – the city of Adelaide in Australia, Queen Adelaide, Cambridgeshire, Adelaide Archipelago, Adelaide Island
 Adhemar, Belgian comics character – Bronzen Adhemar
 Adonis, Greek mythological character – adonis (a good looking, handsome young boy), adonism, Adonis, adonis (species of skink)
 Aeolus, Greek mythological character – Aeolian harp
 Adam Afzelius, Swedish botanist – Afzelius's disease, afzelia
 Agag, biblical king – Agagites
 Agatha of Sicily, Italian Christian martyr – St. Agatha's Tower
 Agrippina the Younger, Roman empress – Cologne, Germany (formerly Colonia Agrippina)
 Ahasuerus, Biblical character – the term "ahasverus" is used to describe a "restless person" in certain languages, Ahasverus
 Alfred V. Aho, Canadian computer scientist – the first letter of the name AWK, a computer pattern/action language, is taken from Aho
 George Biddell Airy, English mathematician and astronomer - Airy disk
 Ajax, Greek mythological character – Ajax Amsterdam
 Akademos, Greek mythological character – academy
 Akela, British literary character – Akela, another term for 'scoutsleader'
 Rabbi Akiva, Judean rabbi – Bnei Akiva
 Muhammad ibn Musa al-Khwarizmi, Latinized as "Algoritmi", Persian mathematician – algorithm.
 Abd al-Rahman al-Sufi, Persian astronomer - al-Sufi's cluster (an easy-to-observe asterism in the constellation Vulpecula which looks like a coathanger, also known as Brocchi's Cluster and Collinder 399).
 Semyon Alapin, Lithuanian chess player  – Alapin's Opening
 Albert, Prince Consort, British prince – Prince Albert piercing, a form of male genital piercing; Alberta (Canada), Albert Bridge, London, Albert Bridge, Glasgow, Royal Albert Dock, Liverpool, Royal Albert Dock, London, Royal Albert Hall, Albert Memorial, Lake Albert, Prince Albert, Saskatchewan, Albert Medal
 Adolf Albin, Romanian chess player – Albin Countergambit
 Alcaeus, Greek poet – Alcaic stanza
 Alexander Alekhine, Russian chess player – Alekhine's Defence
 Alexander of Aphrodisias, Greek philosopher – Alexandrism, Alexander's band
 Alexander the Great, Greek-Macedonian conqueror  – Alexandria, İskenderun, Kandahar, alexandrine
 Matthew Algie, Scottish businessman – "Matthew Algie" (company)
 Alice, British literary character – Alice in Wonderland syndrome
 Thomas Allinson, British physician – Allinson bread
 Herb Alpert and Jerry Moss, American musicians – A&M Records
 Arthur Cecil Alport, South African physician – Alport syndrome
 Walter C. Alvarez, American physician − Alvarez' syndrome; Alvarez-waves; Walter C. Alvarez Memorial Award
 Alois Alzheimer, German neurologist – Alzheimer's disease
 Amanullah Khan, Afghan king – The Dutch term "ammehoela" (which means "yeah, right!" or "what do I care?")
 Amaryllis, Roman literary character from Virgil's pastoral Eclogues – amaryllis
 Amazon, Greek mythological tribe – Amazon River
 Adelbert Ames Jr., American scientist — Ames room, Ames trapezoid
 Bruce Ames, American biochemist – Ames test
 Jakob Ammann, Swiss-American religious leader – Amish
 Amor (Latin name for Cupid), Greek mythological character – The French word "amour" and the Italian word "amore" (which both mean "love")
 André-Marie Ampère, French scientist – ampere – unit of electric current, Ampère's law, amp
 Amun, Egyptian god – ammonia
 Roald Amundsen, Norwegian explorer – Amundsen Sea; Amundsen crater, a crater on the Moon; Amundsen–Scott South Pole Station
 Ignacio "Nacho" Anaya – inventor of nachos
 José de Anchieta, Spanish priest – Anchieta Island, Anchieta, Espírito Santo, Anchieta, Santa Catarina, Rodovia Anchieta
 Andromeda, Greek mythological character – Andromeda constellation, Andromeda Galaxy, Andromeda polifolia
 Anders Jonas Ångström, Swedish physicist – angstrom, unit of distance
 Adolf Anderssen, German chess player – Anderssen's Opening
 Saint Andrew, Christian apostle – Order of Saint Andrew, Saint Andrew's Cross, St Andrews, Scotland, San Andreas Fault, and numerous other localities, churches and cathedrals.
 Anne of Denmark, Scottish queen – Queen Anne's Men
 Anne, Queen of Great Britain, British queen – Queen Anne style architecture, Queen Anne style furniture, Statute of Anne, Queen Anne's Bounty
 Antoninus Pius, Roman emperor – Antonine Wall
 Virginia Apgar, American physician and anesthesiologist – Apgar score
 Aphrodite, Greek mythological character – aphrodisiac
 Apollinaris of Ravenna – Apollinaris (water)
 Apollo, Greek mythological character – Apollonian and Dionysian, Apollo archetype
 Apollonius of Perga, Greek mathematician and astronomer – Apollonian circles, Apollonian gasket, Apollonian network, Apollonius' theorem, Problem of Apollonius
 Saint Thomas Aquinas, Italian philosopher – Thomism, many educational institutions
 Yasser Arafat, Palestinian politician and activist – Arafat scarf (nickname for a Palestinian keffiyeh)
 Aram, son of Shem, biblical character – Aram (region)
 Rafael Moreno Aranzadi, nicknamed Pichichi, Spanish association football player – Pichichi Trophy
 Archimedes, Greek mathematician – Archimedes' screw, Archimedes' principle, Archimedean point, Claw of Archimedes, Archimedean solid
 Henryk Arctowski, Polish scientist and explorer - Arctowski's arc (a rare halo phenomenon)
 Argus Panoptes, Greek mythological character – argus-eyed, great argus (pheasant species), scatophagus argus (fish species)
 Albert Wojciech Adamkiewicz, Polish pathologist – Artery of Adamkiewicz
 Ariadne, Greek mythological character – Ariadne's thread (logic)
 Aristoteles, Greek mathematician and philosopher – Aristotelianism, Aristotelian ethics, Aristotelian physics, Aristotelian Society, Aristotelian theology, Aristotelia, Aristotle Mountains, Aristotle's wheel paradox, Aristotle's theory of universals, Pseudo-Aristotle
 Jacobus Arminius, Dutch theologian – Arminianism
 Louis Armstrong, American jazz musician, who was nicknamed Satchmo – Satchmo's syndrome
 William George Armstrong, British inventor and business man – Armstrong breech-loading gun
 Arthur, British-Welsh mythological king – Arthurian fantasy, Arthurian heraldry, Arthurian legend
 José Gervasio Artigas, Uruguayan revolutionary leader – Artiguism
 Asclepius, Greek mythological character – rod of Asclepius, therapeutae of Asclepius
 Ashur, biblical character – Assyria
 Hans Asperger, Austrian psychologist – Asperger syndrome
 Atalanta, Greek mythological character – Atalanta butterfly
 Mustafa Kemal Atatürk, Turkish president – Kemalism (also known as Atatürkism)
 Athena, Greek goddess – The Greek city Athens, atheneum, Athens, Athene (bird)
 Robert Atkins, American nutriotinist – Atkins diet
 Atlas, Greek mythological character – atlas, Atlas, atlas, Atlas, Atlas, Atlas, Atlas bear, Atlas beetle, Atlas cedar, Atlas pied flycatcher, Atlas moth, Atlas turtle
 Atthis, Greek mythological character – Atthis, Attica
 Shlomo Zalman Auerbach, Israeli rabbi and theologist – Ramat Shlomo
 Aurélio Buarque de Holanda Ferreira, Brazilian lexicographer – Aurélio's Brazilian Portuguese Dictionary, nicknamed the "Big Aurélio" in Portuguese.
 Augeas, Greek mythological king – Augean stable
 Augustus Caesar, Roman emperor – the month of August; the city of Zaragoza (originally Caesaraugustus); the city of Caesarea in Israel; numerous other cities once named Caesarea; Augustan age
 R. Stanton Avery, American inventor and businessman – Avery Dennison Corporation
 Amedeo Avogadro, Italian chemist – Avogadro constant, Avogadro's law
 Nnamdi Azikiwe, Nigerian president – Zikism

B 
 Bebot, Mother of Kenneth John – Bebot
 Báb, Persian religious leader – Bábism
 Charles Babbage, British mathematician and inventor – Babbage engine, Babbage
 Isaac Babbitt, American inventor – Babbitt metal
 Joseph Babinski, French neurologist – Babinski's sign, Anton–Babinski syndrome, Babinski–Fröhlich syndrome, Babinski–Froment syndrome, Babinski–Nageotte syndrome, Babinski–Vaquez syndrome, Babinski–Weil test, Babinski–Jarkowski rule.
 Lauren Bacall, American actress – Bogart–Bacall syndrome
 Facundo Bacardi, Spanish-Cuban business man – Bacardi, Bacardi cocktail, Bacardi Breezer
 Bacchus, Greek-Roman mythological character – Bacchic, Bacchic art, Bacchanalia
 Edward Bach, British physician – Bach flower remedies
 Johann Sebastian Bach, German composer – BACH motif
 John Backus, American computer scientist – Backus–Naur form
 Karl Baedeker, German business man – Baedeker
 Leo Baekeland, Belgian inventor – Bakelite
 William Baffin, British explorer – Baffin Bay, Baffin Island
 Bahá'u'lláh, Persian religious leader – Baháʼí Faith
 Bahram V Gur, Persian king – bahramdipity
 Donald Bailey, British engineer and inventor – Bailey bridge
 Francis Baily, British astronomer – Baily's beads
 René Baire, French mathematician – Baire category theorem, Baire function, Baire measure, Baire set, Baire space, Baire space, Property of Baire
 John Randal Baker (1900–1984), English zoologist and anthropologist – Microscopic staining merthods: for lipids, Baker's acid-haematein, and for mucins his mucicarmine
 Italo Balbo, Italian aviator and politician – Balbo, Seventh Street Balbo Drive (street in Chicago)
 Ed Balducci, Italian-American illusionist – Balducci levitation
 J. G. Ballard, British author – Ballardian, Ballardesque
 János Balogh, Hungarian-Romanian chess master – Balogh Defense
 Balthazar, Biblical character – 12-litre wine bottle (see Wine bottle#Sizes)
 Honoré de Balzac, French author – Balzac Prize
 Bambi, Austrian literary character – Bambi effect, Bambi effect, Bambi Award
 Heinrich Band, German inventor and music instrument builder– Bandoneón
 Bernhard Bang, Danish physician – Bang's disease
 Peter Bang and Svend Olufsen, Danish businesspeople – Bang and Olufsen
 Joseph Banks, British botanician – Banks Peninsula, genus Banksia
 Baphomet, demon character – Sigil of Baphomet
 Barbara, daughter of American business woman Ruth Handler – Barbie doll
 Joseph Barbera and William Hanna, American animators – Hanna-Barbera
 Willem Barentsz, Dutch explorer – Barents Sea, Barentsz bridge, Barents Region
 Francis Baring, British businessman – Barings Bank
 Heinrich Barkhausen, German physicist – Barkhausen effect, Barkhausen stability criterion, Barkhausen–Kurz tube
 Peter Barlow, English mathematician and physicist — Barlow lens
 Thomas Wilson Barnes, British chess master – Barnes Defence, Barnes Opening
 P. T. Barnum, American circus entertainer – Barnum effect
 Murray Barr, Canadian physician – Barr body
 Yvonne Barr and Sir Anthony Epstein, British physicians – Epstein–Barr virus
 Jean Alexandre Barré, French neurologist – Guillain–Barré syndrome, Barré test
 Caspar Bartholin the Younger, Danish physician – Bartholin's gland
 Béla Bartók, Hungarian composer – Bartok pizzicato
 Basarab I of Wallachia – Bessarabia
 Earl W. Bascom, American-Canadian rodeo inventor – Bascom's rigging
 John U. Bascom, American surgeon – Bascom cleft lift procedure
 Karl Adolph von Basedow, German physician – Graves–Basedow disease
 John Baskerville, British typographer – Baskerville
 George Bass, British explorer – Bass Strait
 Tomáš Baťa, Czech businessman – Bata Shoes; Bata Shoe Museum, Tomas Bata University in Zlín, Batawa; Batanagar, India; Batapur, Punjab, Pakistan
 Henry Walter Bates, British biologist – Batesian mimicry
 Émile Baudot, French engineer – Baudot alphabet, Baudot code
 Antoine Baumé, French engineer – Baumé scale
 Bavo of Ghent, Southern-Dutch/Walloon Roman Catholic saint – Bamberg, Germany
 Donald E. Baxter and Delia B. Baxter – Baxter International
 Bryce Bayer, American scientist – Bayer filter
 Friedrich Bayer, German business man – Bayer AG
 Herbert Bayer, Austrian-American graphic designer and architect – Bayer Universal, Architype Bayer
 William Bayliss, British physician – Bayliss effect
 The Beatles, British rock group – Beatlesque, Beatle boot, Beatle haircut, Beatlemania
 Francis Beaufort, French captain – Beaufort scale
 Louis de Béchamel, a courtier of Louis XIV – Béchamel sauce
 Alison Bechdel, American cartoonist – Bechdel test
 Carl Bechstein, German businessman – C. Bechstein
 Warren A. Bechtel, American businessman – Bechtel
 Heinrich Beck, German businessman – Beck's beer, Beck's Futures art prize
 John Bruce Beckwith, American physician – Beckwith–Wiedemann syndrome
 Henri Becquerel, French physicist – becquerel
 John Russell, 4th Duke of Bedford, British politician – Bedfordite
 Michel Bégon, French politician – begonia
 Hulusi Behçet, Turkish dermatologist – Behçet's disease
 Adrian Bejan, Romanian-American mathematician – Bejan number
 Léon Bekaert, Belgian businessman – Bekaert
 Jacob Bekenstein, Israelian-American theoretical physicist – Bekenstein bound
 Édouard Belin, French-Swiss inventor – Belinograph
 Alexander Graham Bell, Scottish inventor – bel – unit of relative power level; Bell Labs, Bell System, BellSouth, Bellcore (now Telcordia Technologies), Regional Bell Operating Company, Bell Canada – companies.
 Francis Bellamy, American religious leader – Bellamy salute.
 Fabian Gottlieb von Bellingshausen, Estonian-German explorer – Bellingshausen Sea
 Nikos Beloyannis, Greek resistance leader – Beloiannisz (village in Hungary)
 Eliezer Ben-Yehuda, Litvak lexicographer  – Ben Yehuda Street, Ben Yehuda Street (Tel Aviv)
 Benedick, British theatrical character – benedick
 Benedict of Nursia, Italian priest – Benedictine
 Edvard Beneš, Czech president – Beneš decrees
 Luciano Benetton, Italian business man – Benetton Group, Benetton Formula
 Charles Benham, English journalist - Benham's top / Benham's disc (a rotating black-and-white disc to show the Fechner color effect)
 Benjamin, Biblical character – a Benjamin (in some languages the youngest son of a family is referred to by this name)
 Pal Benko, Hungarian chess player – Benko Gambit, Benko's Opening
 Arnold Bennett, British novelist – Omelette Arnold Bennett, dish developed at the Savoy Hotel, London
 Floyd Bennett, NASA trajectory designer — Bennett Hill (a lunar mountain, west of the landing site of Apollo 15)
 Linn Boyd Benton, American typographer – Benton Pantograph
 Karl Benz, German businessman – Benz & Cie. (later Daimler-Benz)
 Hiram Berdan, American inventor – Berdan Sharps rifle, Berdan centerfire primer
 Hans Berenberg and Paul Berenberg, German businessman – Berenberg Bank
 Vitus Bering, Danish explorer – Bering Strait, Commander Islands
 Busby Berkeley, American choreographer – "Busby Berkeley choreography", "Busby Berkeley number" (an elaborate sing and dance number with many people involved, usually in a geometrical arrangement)
 David Berkowitz also known as "Son of Sam", American criminal – Son of Sam law
 Emile Berliner, German-American inventor and businessman – Berliner Gramophone
 Maximilian Berlitz, German-American businessman – Berlitz Language Schools
 Juan de Bermúdez, Spanish explorer – Bermuda
 Daniel Bernoulli, Dutch mathematician – Bernoulli's principle
 Sergei Natanovich Bernstein, Russian mathematician – Bernstein polynomial, Bernstein algebra, Bernstein's inequality, Bernstein inequalities in probability theory, Bernstein polynomial, Bernstein's problem, Bernstein's theorem, Bernstein's theorem on monotone functions, Bernstein–von Mises theorem
 Yogi Berra, American baseball player – Yogi Bear, Yogiisms
 Claude Louis Berthollet, French chemist – Berthollide
 Alphonse Bertillon, French police officer – Bertillon method/system.
 Henry Bessemer, British inventor – Bessemer converter, Bessemer steel
 Aneurin Bevan, British politician – Bevanism
 Pierre Bézier, French engineer and mathematician – Bézier curve, Bézier surface
 Wilhelm von Bezold, German physicist and meteorologist — Bezold effect, Bezold-Brücke shift
 Marcel Bich, French-Italian businessman – Bic
 Bieda, a Saxon landowner ("Bieda's ford" + shire) – Bedfordshire
 Max Bielschowsky (1869–1940), German neuropathologist – Bielschowsky's silver stain for nerve fibres 
 Big Brother, British literary character – "Big Brother society" (a society where government surveillance is omnipresent), Big Brother Awards
 Félix Billet, French physician - Billet's rose (a disc shaped scheme, showing the distribution and radii of the first nineteen order rainbows created by an optically infinite pointlike lightsource shining in and through perfect sphere shaped transparent water droplets) 
 Alfred Binet, French mathematician – Stanford-Binet IQ test
 Meyer Herman Bing and Frederik Vilhelm Grøndahl, Danish business people – Bing & Grøndahl
 Bintje Jansma, Dutch pupil – Bintje
 Forrest Bird, American inventor – Bird Innovator
 Henry Bird, British chess player – Bird's Opening
 Clarence Birdseye, American businessman – Captain Birdseye
 Jane Birkin, British pop singer and actress – Birkin bag.
 László Bíró, Hungarian inventor – Biro, (ballpoint pen)
 Sereno Edwards Bishop, scientist, Presbyterian minister and publisher - Bishop's Ring
 Otto von Bismarck, German chancellor – Bismarck Archipelago and Bismarck Sea near New Guinea; German battleship Bismarck as well as two ships of the Imperial Navy (Kaiserliche Marine); Bismarck, North Dakota, Bismarck herring
 Fischer Black and Myron Scholes, American economists – Black–Scholes formula, Black–Scholes equation
 S. Duncan Black and Alonzo G. Decker, American business men – Black & Decker
 Tony Blair, British Prime Minister – Blairism, Blatcherism
 William Blair - Blair Cuspids (so-called needle shaped objects on the moon's surface, created by long shadows of boulders lit by a low sun)
 Louis Auguste Blanqui, French politician and activist – Blanquism
 Louis Blériot, French aviator – Recherches Aéronautiques Louis Blériot.
 Charles K. Bliss, Ukrainian-Austrian engineer – Blissymbols.
 André Bloch, French mathematician, Bloch space, Bloch's theorem (complex variables)
 Felix Bloch, Swiss-American physician – Bloch wall, Bloch sphere, Bloch's theorem
 Charles Blondin, French acrobat – Blondin (quarry equipment)
 Amelia Bloomer, American activist – bloomers
 Benjamin Blumenfeld, Belarusian chess player – Blumenfeld Gambit
 Boann, Irish mythological character – The River Boyne
 Johann Elert Bode and Johann Daniel Titius, German astronomers – Titius–Bode law
 David Bodian (1910–1992), – American medical scientist – Bodian's protargol stain 
 Giambattista Bodoni, Italian typographer – Bodoni
 William Boeing, American aviator – Boeing Commercial Airplanes
 Herman Boerhaave, Dutch physician – Boerhaave syndrome
 Humphrey Bogart, American actor – Bogart–Bacall syndrome
 Efim Bogoljubov, Russian-German chess player – Bogo-Indian Defence
 Bogomil, Bulgarian religious leader – Bogomilism
 Niels Bohr, Danish physicist – Bohr magneton, Bohr radius, bohrium
 Lecoq de Boisbaudran, French chemist – gallium, chemical element. Although named after Gallia (Latin for France), Lecoq de Boisbaudran, the discoverer of the metal, subtly attached an association with his name. Lecoq (rooster) in Latin is gallus.
 Bart Jan Bok, Dutch astronomer – Bok globules
 Simón Bolívar, Bolivian general and president – Bolivia, Bolívar Department, Colombia, various cities and tows named Bolívar en Venezuela and Colombia, Venezuelan bolívar, Bolívar, Bolivarism
 Jean Bolland, Belgian priest – Bollandists
 Lucas Bols, Dutch businessman – Bols (brand)
 Ludwig Boltzmann, German mathematician – Boltzmann constant, Stefan–Boltzmann constant, Stefan–Boltzmann law
 Napoleon Bonaparte, French general and emperor – Bonapartism, Napoleonic Code, Napoleon Empire, Napoleonic Wars, Napoleon complex, Napoleon Opening, Napoleon's theorem, Napoleon's problem, Napoleon snake eel, Napoleon fish, Napoleon, Napoleon points, Napoleonka
 George Alan Bond, American-Australian business man – Bonds
 George Boole, British mathematician – Boolean algebra
 Gail Borden, American business man – "Borden Condensed Milk", Borden County, Texas
 Jules Bordet, Belgian physicist – Bordetella
 Amadeo Bordiga, Italian politician – Bordigism
 Armand Borel, French mathematician – Borel–Weil–Bott theorem, Borel conjecture, Borel fixed-point theorem, Borel's theorem
 Émile Borel, French mathematician – Borel algebra, Borel's lemma, Borel's law of large numbers, Borel measure, Borel–Kolmogorov paradox, Borel–Cantelli lemma, Borel–Carathéodory theorem, Heine–Borel theorem, Borel summation, Borel distribution
 Alexander Borodin, Russian composer and chemist – Borodin reaction
 Karel Havlíček Borovský, Czech novelist – Havlíčkův Brod
 Giuseppe Borsalino, Italian businessman – Borsalino
 Bernard Bosanquet, British cricketer – bosie, the Australian term for the cricket technique googly
 Hieronymus Bosch, Dutch painter – Boschian
 Robert Bosch, German business man and inventor – Robert Bosch GmbH
 Amar Bose, American business man and inventor – Bose Corporation, Bose speaker packages
 Satyendra Nath Bose, Indian physicist – bosons, Bose–Einstein statistics, Bose–Einstein condensate
 Jean-Marc Bosman, Belgian association football player – Bosman ruling
 C. F. Bottlinger - Bottlinger's rings (ellipse shaped rings around the Subsun)
 Elbert Dysart Botts, American engineer and inventor – Botts' dots, a street and highway lane separator
 Louis Antoine de Bougainville, French navigator – the bougainvillea plant, which he discovered.
 Pierre Bouguer, French mathematician, geophysicist, geodesist, and astronomer - Bouguer's halo (aka Ulloa's circle, the Fog bow)
 Georges Boulanger, French politician – Boulangism
 Matthew Boulton and James Watt, British inventors and business people – Boulton and Watt
 Habib Bourguiba, Tunesian president – Bourguibism
 Thierry Boutsen, Belgian car racer – Boutsen Aviation
 Sir Frank Bowden, 1st Baronet, British businessman – Bowden cable.
 Thomas Bowdler, British publisher – to bowdlerize
 Jim Bowie, American inventor – Bowie knife
 Sir William Bowman, British anatomist – Bowman's capsule
 Charles Boycott, Irish politician – boycott
 Robert Boyle, Irish chemist – Boyle's law
 Rudolph Boysen, American horticulturist – boysenberry
 Tycho Brahe, Danish astronomer – Tychonic system, Tycho Brahe days
 Tom Bradley, American politician – Bradley effect.
 Brahma, Hindu deity – Brahmanism
 Brahmagupta, Indian mathematician and astronomer – Brahmagupta's formula, Brahmagupta's identity, Brahmagupta's trapezium, Brahmagupta's problem, Brahmagupta's polynomial
 Johannes Brahms, German composer – Brahms guitar
 Louis Braille, French inventor – braille writing
 Matthew Bramley, British butcher – Bramley apple
 Karl Ferdinand Braun, German physicist – "Braun tube" (in some languages the cathode ray tube is referred to as such) Karl Ferdinand Braun Prize
 Auguste Bravais, French physicist known for his work in crystallography - Bravais arc (aka the Circumzenithal arc)
 Pierre Savorgnan de Brazza, Italian explorer – Brazzaville, De Brazza's monkey
 Abraham-Louis Breguet, Swiss watch maker – Breguet (brand)
 Louis Charles Breguet, French aviator – Breguet Aviation, Breguet 14, Breguet's range equation
 Jacques Brel, Belgian singer – Brelian crescendo
 Hans-Joachim Bremermann, German-American mathematician and biophysicist  – Bremermann's limit
 Jack Elton Bresenham, American computer scientist – Bresenham's line algorithm
 Ebenezer Cobham Brewer, British lexicographer – Brewer's Dictionary of Phrase and Fable
 Leonid Brezhnev, Russian head of state – Brezhnev Doctrine
 Richard Bright, British physician – Bright's disease
 Jean Anthelme Brillat-Savarin, French gastronomer – Brillat-Savarin cheese, Gâteau Savarin
 Thomas Brisbane, British politician – Brisbane and Brisbane River
 Paul Broca, French neurologist – Broca's aphasia, Broca's area
 Dalmero Francis Brocchi, amateur astronomer and chart maker for the American Association of Variable Star Observers (AAVSO) - Brocchi's Cluster
 Henry James Brooke, British crystallographer – Brookite
 Mel Brooks, American film director and actor – Brooksfilms
 Gordon Brown, British Prime Minister – Brownism
 Robert Brown, Scottish botanist – Brownian motion
 John Browning, American inventor – Browning firearms, including the M1918 Browning Automatic Rifle and Browning Hi-Power
 Archibald Bruce, American mineralogist – Brucite.
 Catherine Wolfe Bruce, American humanitarian activist – Bruce Medal.
 David Bruce, Australian-Scottish pathologist and microbiologist – Brucella, brucellosis.
 James Bruce, Scottish explorer – brucine.
 R. H. Bruck, American mathematician – Bruck–Ryser–Chowla theorem
 Anton Bruckner, Austrian composer – Bruckner rhythm
 Pieter Bruegel the Elder, Flemish painter – Bruegelian (a jolly eat- and drink festivity which resembles scenes from his paintings.), Bruegel, Brueghel's syndrome, "Bruegel Ancienne" (a Belgian beer brand)
 Johannes Brugman, Dutch priest – "praten als Brugman" ("to talk like Brugman", indicating a powerful speech)
 Marcus Junius Brutus, Italian politician – brutal, brutality, brute
 Prince Brychan, British king – Brecknockshire
 Bucca, Saxon landowner ("Bucca's home" + shire) – Buckinghamshire
 Bucephalus, horse of Alexander the Great – Bucephala (city), Bucephala (bird)
 Buddha, Nepalese religious leader – Buddhism
 Semyon Budyonny, Russian general – Budyonny horse
 Ettore Bugatti, Italian businessman – Bugatti
 Muhammadu Buhari, Nigerian president – Buharism
 David Dunbar Buick, American businessman – Buick
 Dagwood Bumstead, American comics character – Dagwood sandwich
 Archie Bunker, American TV character – the Bunker vote (political term describing the affiliations of mainly white, lower class voters who share conservative, bigoted viewpoints with Bunker)
 Robert Bunsen, German inventor – Bunsen burner
 Viktor Bunyakovsky, Russian mathematician – Bunyakovsky conjecture
 Johan Burgers Dutch businessman — Royal Burgers' Zoo
 Jean Buridan, French philosopher – Buridan's ass
 William Burke, Irish criminal – to burke (to execute someone by suffocation)
 Robert Burns, Scottish poet – Burns stanza
 Ambrose Burnside, American general – sideburns
 Wilhelm Busch, German comics artist and illustrator – Wilhelm Busch Prize
 George W. Bush, American president – Bush Doctrine, Bushism
 Lord Byron, British poet – Byronic; Byronism

C 
 John Cadbury, British businessman – Cadbury
 Antoine de la Mothe Cadillac, French explorer – Cadillac
 Julius Caesar, Roman consul and general – the month of July, Caesar cipher, the titles Czar, Tsar, and Kaiser, the Bloody Caesar cocktail. An urban legend also erroneously credits Julius Caesar as having given his name to the caesarean section; the two are likely unrelated, however.
 Cain, Biblical character – Cain's mark
 Santiago Ramón y Cajal, Spanish physician – Cajal's cell
 Calimero, Italian cartoon character – Calimero complex (used to denote people who are staunchly convinced that their position as an underdog is due to their smaller size, either literally or symbolically, which covers up for their own shortcomings). In some languages, like Italian and Israeli Hebrew the word "calimero" is also used to refer to biker helmets.
 John Calvin, Swiss theologian – Calvinism.
 Calypso, Greek mythological character – calypso (plant), calypso music, calypso (camera).
 Pierre Cambronne, French general – The French word "cambronniser" and the expression "le mot de Cambronne" ("The word of Cambronne"), which both refer to the vulgar expression "merde"!" ("shit!") he uttered during the Battle of Waterloo
 Gaspare Campari, Italian businessman – Campari
 Joseph A. Campbell, American businessman – Campbell Soup Company
 Canaan (son of Ham), biblical character – Canaan
 Myrtelle Canavan, American physician – Canavan's disease
 Candaules, Lydian king – candaulism
 Stanislao Cannizzaro (1826–1910), Italian chemist – Cannizzaro reaction
 Georg Cantor, German mathematician – Cantor algebra, Cantor cube, Cantor function, Cantor space, Cantor's back-and-forth method, Cantor–Bernstein theorem, Heine–Cantor theorem
 Joseph Capgras, French psychologist – Capgras delusion
 Frank Capra, American film director – Capraesque
 Caran d'Ache, French cartoonist – Caran d'Ache
 Gerolamo Cardano, Italian mathematician and physician – cardan joint, Cardan grille, Cardano's Rings
 Caesar Cardini, Italian-American restaurateur – Caesar salad
 Jonathan Carey, American autistic child – Jonathan's Law
 Carl Carl, Polish-born actor and theatre director – Carltheater
 Infante Carlos, Count of Molina, Spanish king – Carlism
 Carlota Joaquina of Spain, Portuguese queen – Carlotism, Teatro Nacional de São Carlos
 Horatio Caro, British chess player – Caro–Kann Defence
 Vittore Carpaccio, Italian painter – carpaccio
 Philip Carteret, British explorer – Carteret Islands
 Sam Carr, neighbour of American serial killer David Berkowitz also known as "Son of Sam" – Son of Sam law
 Enrico Caruso, Italian opera tenor – Caruso Sauce
 Giacomo Casanova, Italian adventurer and diarist – casanova (a womanizer)
 Hendrik Casimir, Dutch physicist – Casimir effect
 Cassandra, Greek mythological character – Cassandra
 Laurent Cassegrain, French inventor – Cassegrain reflecting telescope
 Giovanni Domenico Cassini, Italian astronomer and mathematician – Cassini Division, Cassini oval, Cassini's laws, Cassini and Catalan identities, Cassini's moon maiden (a pareidolia in Promontorium Heraclides near Sinus Iridum), Cassini's bright spot (a high-albedo craterlet with bright nimbus on the floor of the walled plain Deslandres on the moon)
 Paul de Casteljau, French physicist and mathematician – De Casteljau's algorithm
 Fidel Castro, Cuban president – Castroism
 Catherine of Alexandria, Christian martyr – Catherine wheel.
 Catherine I of Russia, Russian empress – Yekaterinburg, Catherine Palace, Catherine Park
 Augustin-Louis Cauchy, French mathematician – List of things named after Augustin-Louis Cauchy
 Eduard Čech, Czech mathematician – Čech cohomology, Čech complex, Čech homology, Stone–Čech compactification
 Hugh Cecil, 1st Baron Quickswood, British politician – Hughligans
 Celadon, French literary character – celadon
 Anders Celsius, Swedish physicist and astronomer – degree Celsius (unit of temperature) Celsius (Moon crater)
 Cerberus, Greek mythological character – Cerberus (protein), Cerberus (snake)
 Ceredig, British Celtic chieftain – Cardigan
 Clyde Cessna, American aviator and businessman – Cessna Aircraft.
 Mr. Chadband, British literary character – Chadband
 Carlos Chagas, Brazilian physician – Chagas disease
 Harry Chamberlin, American inventor — Chamberlin
 Jacques-François de Chambray, French governor – Fort Chambray
 Subrahmanyan Chandrasekhar, Indian-American astronomer and physicist – Chandrasekhar limit, Chandra X-ray Observatory
 Coco Chanel, French fashion designer – Chanel, Chanel No. 5
 Chaos, Greek mythological character – chaos.
 Charlie Chaplin, British comedian, film actor and director – Chaplinesque, Chaplin moustache.
 Jean-Antoine Chaptal, French chemist – chaptalization
 Jean-Martin Charcot, French neurologist – Charcot–Marie–Tooth disease; Maladie de Charcot, the French name for motor neurone disease
 Charles I of England, English king – North Carolina and South Carolina
 Charles III of Monaco, Monegasque king – Monte Carlo
 Charles IV, Holy Roman Emperor – places called Carlsbad, Karlstein Castle, Karlovy Vary, Charles University, Charles Bridge
 Charles VI, Holy Roman Emperor – château Karlova Koruna
 Jacques Charles and Joseph Louis Gay-Lussac, French physicists – Law of Charles and Gay-Lussac (frequently called simply Charles' Law)
 Carl Charlier, Swedish astronomer and physicist – Charlier polynomials
 Bobby Charlton, British association football player  – the "Bobby Charlton" comb over hairstyle.
 Charlotte of Mecklenburg-Strelitz, British queen – Queen Charlotte Islands, Queen Charlotte City, Queen Charlotte Sound, Fort Charlotte, Charlottesville, Virginia, Charlottesville, Virginia
 Michel Chasles, French mathematician – Chasles' theorem
 François-René de Chateaubriand, French writer – Chateaubriand steak
 Nicolas Chauvin, French soldier – chauvinism
 Hugo Chávez, Venezuelan president – Chavismo
 Anton Chekhov, Russian playwright – Chekhov's gun
 Vitaly Chekhover, Russian chess player – Sicilian Defence, Chekhover Variation
 Pavel Alekseyevich Cherenkov, Russian physicist – Cherenkov effect
 Louis Chevrolet, French businessman – Chevrolet
 Chewbacca, film character – Chewbacca defense
 Chimaera, Greek mythological character – Chimaera The term "chimaera" has come to describe any mythical or fictional animal with parts taken from various animals, or to describe anything composed of very disparate parts, or perceived as wildly imaginative, implausible, or dazzling.
 Thomas Chippendale, British furniture designer – Chippendale furniture.
 Ernst Chladni, German physicist – Chladni patterns
 Jesus Christ, Biblical prophet – Christianity, Christmas, Christ complex (also known as Messianic complex), Christchurch, Jesuit Jesus' nickname "The Saviour" also inspired the name of El Salvador.
 Agatha Christie, British novelist – Agatha Christie indult
 James Christie, British auctioner – Christie's
 Saint Christopher, Christian martyr – Saint Kitts and Nevis.
 Walter Chrysler, American businessman – Chrysler, DaimlerChrysler, Chrysler Building
 Alfred Chuang, Chinese-American computer scientist – The third letter of the company name BEA Systems, is taken from his first name.
 Alonzo Church, American mathematician – Church–Turing thesis, Church–Turing–Deutsch principle
 Charles Churchill, American-British businessman – Churchill Machine Tool Company
 Winston Churchill, British Prime Minister – Churchill tank, Churchill cigars, Churchill (cocktail)
 Cincinnatus, Roman politician – Cincinnati (indirectly)
 Cinderella, European fairy tale character – Cinderella, Cinderella complex, Cinderella effect
 André Citroën, French businessman – Citroën
 Senator Claghorn, character on the Fred Allen radio show – Foghorn Leghorn
 Claude of France, French queen – Reine Claude
 Claudius, Roman emperor – the city of Kayseri, formerly Caesarea Mazaca, in Turkey.
 Moses Cleaveland, American politician – Cleveland
 Gaëtan Gatian de Clérambault, French psychologist – Kandinsky–Clérambault syndrome
 Ruth Cleveland, daughter of American president Grover Cleveland – Baby Ruth candy bars.
 Bill Clinton, American president – Clintonomics, Clintonism, Clintonian
 Henri Coandă, Romanian inventor – Coandă effect
 John Robert Cobb, American physician – Cobb angle
 Richard Cobden, British politician – Cobdenism
 Richard Temple, 1st Viscount Cobham, British politician and soldier – Cobhamite
 John Cockerill, British businessman – Cockerill-Sambre
 William Frederick "Buffalo Bill" Cody, American frontiersman and entertainer – Cody, Wyoming
 Jean-Baptiste Colbert, French politician – Colbertism, Colbert coat, sauce Colbert
 William T. Coleman III, American businessman – the first letter of the company name BEA Systems, is taken from his first name.
 Edgard Colle, Belgian chess player – Colle System
 Samuel Colt, American gun inventor – Colt revolver.
 Christopher Columbus, Italian explorer – Egg of Columbus; many places and territories, see Columbus, Colombia, Colombo, British Columbia in Canada
 Arthur Compton, American physicist – Compton scattering
 Nicolas de Condorcet, French mathematician and philosopher – Condorcet method
 Confucius, Chinese philosopher – Confucianism
 Constantine I, Roman Emperor – Constantinople
 Nicolas-Jacques Conté, French inventor – Conté crayon
 James Cook, British explorer – Cook Islands; Cooktown, Queensland; James Cook University (Townsville); Cook (suburb of Canberra; co-named for Sir Joseph Cook); Cooks River; Cook (Federal electorate); James Cook University Hospital (Marton, Middlesbrough, England); Aoraki / Mount Cook; Cook Strait
 D. B. Cooper, American criminal – Cooper vane
 Kenneth H. Cooper, American physician – Cooper test
 Ralph Copeland, English astronomer - Copeland Septet
 Nicolaus Copernicus, Polish astronomer – Copernican heliocentrism, Copernican Revolution, Copernican principle, copernicium
 Godfrey Copley, British art collector – Copley Medal
 Gaspard-Gustave de Coriolis, French mathematician – Coriolis effect
 Pierre Corneille, French playwright – Cornelian dilemma
 Nicolas Cotoner, Maltese prince – Cottonera Lines
 Charles-Augustin de Coulomb, French physicist – coulomb, Coulomb's law
 Thomas Cowling, British mathematician and astronomer – Cowling model
 William Cowper, British anatomist – Cowper's gland
 Michael Cowpland, British businessman – Corel (the first two letters were lifted from his first name), Mitel with Terry Matthews (Mitel stands MIke and TErry's Lawnmowers)
 Richard Cox, British horticulturist – Cox's Orange Pippin
 Bettino Craxi, Italian Prime Minister – Craxism
 Seymour Cray, American computerengineer and inventor – Cray Research
 Elliott Cresson, American businessman – Elliott Cresson Medal
 Hans Gerhard Creutzfeldt and Alfons Maria Jakob, German physicians – Creutzfeldt–Jakob disease
 Burrill Bernard Crohn, American physician – Crohn's disease
 Jim Crow, American theatrical character – Jim Crow law
 Robinson Crusoe, British literary character – Robinsonade, Robinson Crusoe economy
 Johan Cruyff, Dutch association football player – Cruijffiaans
 Cunedda, Welsh king – Gwynedd
 Cupid, Greek-Roman mythological character – Cupid's bow
 Marie and Pierre Curie, French physicists – Curie, curium
 Pierre Curie, French physicist – Curie point
 Haskell Curry, American mathematician – currying, Curry's paradox, Curry–Howard correspondence
 Robert E. Curtiss - Curtiss' cross (a clair-obscur effect on the moon's surface, created by low western sunlight shining on the Fra Mauro Zeta complex (Fra Mauro ζ complex), showing some sort of Maltese cross) 
 Mary Curzon, Baroness Curzon of Kedleston, British noblewomen – Lady Curzon Soup
 Cush (Bible), biblical character – Kingdom of Kush
 Harvey Cushing, American physician – Cushing's syndrome
 Saint Cuthbert, Celtic priest ("church of Cuthbert") – Kirkcudbright
 Saint Cyril, Greek missionary – Cyrillic alphabet

D 
 Dactyl, Greek mythological character – dactyly, syndactyly, polydactyly.
 Daedalus, Greek mythological character – Daedala
 Louis Daguerre, French photographer and inventor – Daguerreotype
 Anders Dahl, Swedish botanist – Dahlia
 Gottlieb Daimler and Karl Benz, German businesspeople – DaimlerBenz (later DaimlerChrysler)
 Dalek, British TV character – Popular nickname for the Bridgewater Place, Dalekmania
 Salvador Dalí, Spanish painter – Dalí moustache, Dalíesque
 John Dalton, British physicist and chemist – dalton, non-SI unit of atomic mass, Daltonism
 Tadd Dameron, American jazz musician – Tadd Dameron turnaround
 Pedro Damiano, Portuguese chess player – Damiano Defence
 Damocles, Greek mythological character – Sword of Damocles
 Glenn Danzig – Danzig (band)
 Daphne, Greek mythological character – Daphne, daphnia
 Henry Darcy, French engineer – darcy, Darcy's law
 Charles Darwin, British biologist – Darwinism, Neural Darwinism, Social Darwinism, Darwinian Happiness, Darwin's theory of evolution, Darwinian selection, Non-darwinian evolution, Darwinian medicine, Darwin, Northern Territory, Darwin Mounds, Charles Darwin University, Darwin College, Cambridge, Charles Darwin National Park, Darwin Awards, Darwin's finches, Darwin Island, another Darwin Island, Charles Darwin Research Station, Darwin Bay, Lecocarpus darwinii (a tree species), Charles Darwin Foundation, Darwin's Arch
 Adi Dassler, German businessman – adidas
 David, biblical character – Star of David, City of David, David's harp
 Jean-Baptist David, Belgian activist – Davidsfonds
 Arthur Davidson and William S. Harley, American businesspeople – Harley–Davidson
 John Davis, British explorer – Davis quadrant
 Humphry Davy, British chemist and inventor – Davy lamp
 Richard Dawkins, British scientist and activist  – Dawkinsia, Richard Dawkins Award
 Gene Day, Canadian comics artist – Howard E. Day Prize
 Deborah, biblical character – Deborah number (dimensionless number in rheology)
 Paul de Casteljau, French mathematician – de Casteljau's algorithm
 Daniel De Leon, American trade union leader – De Leonism
 John DeLorean, American car inventor  – DeLorean.
 Michael Dell, American businessman – founder of Dell, the computer company
 John and Peter Delmonico, Swiss-American restaurant holders – Delmonico steak
 Demosthenes, Greek orator – Demosthenic
 Deng Xiaoping, Chinese head of state – Deng Xiaoping Theory
 Arnaud Denjoy, French mathematician – Denjoy integral
 Thomas Derrick (c. 1600), British hangman – Derrick (lifting device)
 René Descartes, French philosopher – Cartesian coordinate system, Cartesianism
 David Deutsch, Israeli-British physicist – Church–Turing–Deutsch principle
 Melvil Dewey, American librarian  – Dewey Decimal System
 Thomas Dewey, American politician – Dewey, one of "Huey, Dewey and Louie", animated cartoon characters
Porfirio Díaz, Mexican dictator – Porfiriato
 Charles Dickens, British novelist – Dickensian
 Saint Didacus, Spanish priest – San Diego
 Bo Diddley, American blues/rock and roll singer and guitarist – Bo Diddley beat
 Rudolf Diesel, German inventor – diesel engine
 Milovan Đilas, Yugoslav politician Đilasism
 Diogenes, Greek philosopher – Diogenes syndrome
 Dionysus, Greek mythological character – Dionysia
 Paul Dirac, French mathematician – Dirac fermion, Dirac spinor, Dirac equation, Dirac delta function, Dirac sea, Dirac Prize, Fermi–Dirac statistics
 Johann Dirichlet, German mathematician – Dirichlet function, Dirichlet's theorem on arithmetic progressions
 Walt Disney, American animator and film producer – The Walt Disney Company, Disneyland, Disneyfication, Disneyism
 Edward Divers, British chemist – Divers's solution
 François Divisia, French economist – divisia index
 Jeremiah Dixon and Charles Mason, British astronomers – Mason–Dixon Line
 Albert Döderlein, German physician – Döderlein's bacilli
 John Francis Dodge and Horace Dodge, American businesspeople – Dodge
 Dogberry, British theatrical character – dogberryism (synonym for malapropism)
 Karl Gottfried Paul Döhle, German pathologist – Döhle bodies
 Doily, British draper – doily
 Ray Dolby, American inventor – Dolby Stereo, Dolby Surround and Dolby Pro Logic
 Domhnall mac Raghnaill, Hebridean magnate – Clann Domhnaill
 Don Juan, Spanish theatrical character – don juan (womanizer), Don Juanism
 Don Quixote, Spanish literary character – Don Quixote character, Don Quixote complex, Quixotism
 Donatello, Italian painter – Donatello, one of the Teenage Mutant Ninja Turtles comic characters
 Christian Doppler, Austrian physicist – Doppler radar, Doppler effect
 Donald Wills Douglas, Sr., American aviator – Douglas Aircraft Company
 Charles Dow and Edward Jones, American businesspeople – Dow Jones & Company
 Herbert Dow, Canadian-American businessman – Dow Chemical Company
 John Langdon Down, English physician – Down syndrome
 Jimmy "Popeye" Doyle, American literary character – Popeyes Louisiana Kitchen and not the comic and cartoon character Popeye the Sailor.
 Draco, Greek lawmaker – Draconian laws (very severe or cruel laws.)
 Henry Draper, American astronomer – Draper, lunar impact crater
 John William Draper, English-American physician, chemist and photographer – Draper point
 Willem Drees, Dutch Prime Minister – "van drees trekken" (Dutch term for receiving an old age pension financed by the government.)
 Fritz E. Dreifuss, American physician – Emery–Dreifuss muscular dystrophy
 Dubgall mac Somairle, King of the Isles – Clann Dubgaill
 Donald Duck, American cartoon character – Donald Duck voice, Donaldism
 Louis Dufay - Dufaycolor
 Dulcinea, Spanish literary character – a dulcinea (synonym for mistress, sweetheart or an unrequited/platonic love.)
 John Saumarez Dumaresq, British naval officer - Dumaresq (a mechanical computer)
 Dumbo, American cartoon character – Dumbo ears (derogatory term for big ears)
 Robin Dunbar, British anthropologist – Dunbar's number
 John Duns Scotus, Scottish theologist – Dunce cap
 Guillaume Dupuytren, French physician – Dupuytren's contracture, Dupuytren's fracture
 August Dvorak, American psychologist – Dvorak keyboard layout

E 
 Jay Earley, American computer scientist – Earley parser
 Echo, Greek mythological character – echo
 Thomas Edison, American inventor – Edison and Swan Electric Light Company, Edison effect, Edison Gower-Bell Telephone Company of Europe, Ltd., Edison Hotel (Sunbury, Pennsylvania), Edison Illuminating Company, Edison Machine Works, Edison Manufacturing Company, Edison Ore-Milling Company, Edison Portland Cement Company, Edison Records, Edison screw, Edison Storage Battery Company, Edison Studios, Edison, Georgia, Edison, New Jersey, Edisonade, Edisonian approach, Edison–Lalande cell, Hotel Edison, Thomas A. Edison, Inc., Thomas Alva Edison silver dollar
 Prince Edward Augustus, Duke of Kent and Strathearn (younger brother of King George IV and King William IV), commander of British forces in Halifax – Prince Edward Island
 Edward VII, British king – Edwardian
 Gustave Eiffel, French architect – Eiffel Tower
 Egeria, Roman mythological character – Egeria (female advisor), Egeria (genus)
 Albert Einstein, German mathematician and physicist – Einstein refrigerator, einsteinium, Bose–Einstein statistics, Bose–Einstein condensates, Einstein tensor
 David Eisenhower, American presidential relative – Camp David
 Dwight D. Eisenhower, American general and president – Eisenhower Doctrine, Eisenhower jacket
 Will Eisner, American comics artist – Eisner Award
 Biblical Elam, biblical character – Elam
 Electra, Greek mythological character – Electra complex
 Elizabeth I of England, English queen, nicknamed the "Virgin Queen" and "Wingina", a Native American regional king – Virginia, West Virginia, Elizabethan sonnet, Elizabethan era, Elizabethan theatre, Elizabethan architecture, Elizabethan government
 Saint Elmo, Christian martyr – St. Elmo's fire
 Arpad Elo, Hungarian chess player – Elo rating system
 Loránd Eötvös, Hungarian physicist – eotvos, Lorándite, Eötvös effect, Eötvös number, Eötvös rule
 Epicurus, Greek philosopher – epicureanism, Epikoros
 Michael Anthony Epstein and Yvonne Barr, British physicians – Epstein–Barr virus
 Eratosthenes, Greek mathematician – Sieve of Eratosthenes
 Recep Tayyip Erdoğan, Turkish president – Erdoğanism
 Lars Magnus Ericsson, Swedish businessman – Ericsson
 Ériu, Irish mythological character – Éire
 Agner Krarup Erlang, Danish mathematician  – Erlang, Erlang distribution, Erlang (programming language)
 Emil Erlenmeyer, German chemist – Erlenmeyer flask
 Eros, Greek mytholotical character – eroticism, erotomania, erotophobia
 Euclid, Greek mathematician – Euclidean geometry, Euclidean algorithm, Euclidean vector
 Euhemerus, Greek writer – euhemerism
 Leonhard Euler, Swiss mathematician – Euler's formula, Eulerian path, Euler equations; see also: List of topics named after Leonhard Euler
 Europa, Greek mythological character – Europe
 Bartolomeo Eustachi, Italian biologist – Eustachian tube
 Eutyches, Greek religious leader – eutychian
 William Davies Evans, Welsh-British chess player – Evans Gambit
 George Everest, Welsh explorer – Mount Everest
 Ewale a Mbedi, Cameroonian king – Duala people, Douala (from a variant of his name, Dwala)
 Edward Eyre, British explorer – Lake Eyre, Eyre Peninsula, Eyre Highway, Eyre Creek, Mount Eyre, Eyre Mountains (New Zealand)
 Abraham ibn Ezra, Jewish biblical commentator and philosopher – Abenezra (crater)

F 
 Quintus Fabius Maximus Verrucosus, Roman general – Fabian, Fabian Society, Fabianism, Fabian strategy
 Johannes Fabry, German physician – Fabry disease
 Carl Fabergé, Russian artist – Fabergé egg
 Fagin, British literary character – fagin (criminal who trains young thieves)
 Gabriel Fahrenheit, German physicist – the Fahrenheit scale
 Ernst Falkbeer, Austrian chess player – Falkbeer Countergambit
 Gabriele Falloppio, Italian physician – Fallopian tube
 Falstaff, British theatrical character – Fallstaffian (being fat, jolly and debauched)
 Guido Fanconi, Swiss physician – Fanconi syndrome, Fanconi anemia, Fanconi syndrome
 Michael Faraday, British physicist – farad, faraday – cgs unit of current Faraday constant, Faraday effect, Faraday's law of induction, Faraday's law of electrolysis
 Nigel Farage, British politician – Faragism
 Fatima, daughter of the prophet Muhammad – Fatimid
 Fauna, Roman mythological character – fauna
 Faust, German folklore character – Faustian, Faustian deal (a situation in which an ambitious person surrenders moral integrity to achieve power and success for a delimited term)
 Guy Fawkes, British criminal – guy
 Februus, Etruskian-Roman mythological character – February
 Federico Fellini, Italian film director – Fellinesque, Fellinian
 Pierre de Fermat, French mathematician – Fermat's Last Theorem, Fermat's little theorem, Fermat's principle, Fermat's factorization method
 Enrico Fermi, Italian physicist – fermions, Fermi energy, Fermilab, Fermi paradox, fermium – chemical element, Fermi–Dirac statistics fermi (obsolete name for femtometre)
 Enzo Ferrari, Italian businessman – Ferrari
 George Washington Gale Ferris Jr., American inventor – Ferris wheel
 Richard Feynman, American physicist – Feynman diagram
 Fiacre, Irish missionary – Fiacre
 Fib of the Picts, one of the seven sons of Cruthin – Fife
 Leonardo Fibonacci, Italian mathematician – Fibonacci Numbers
 Figaro, French theatrical character – figaro (a hairdresser and/or a cunning servant), figaro chain, Figaro
 Bill Finger, American comics writer – Bill Finger Award
 Bobby Fischer, American chess player – Fischer Defense
 Horace Fletcher, American diet guru – Fletcher technique, Fletcherizing (masticate repeatedly before swallowing nutrition)
 Matthew Flinders, British explorer – Flinders Bay, Flinders Chase National Park, Flinders Island, Flinders Park, South Australia, Flinders Ranges, Flinders River, Flinders Street railway station, Flinders University, Flinders, Victoria (Australia), Flinders bar, Flindersia
 Flora, Roman mythological character – flora, flower
 Pietro Paolo Floriani, Italian architect – Floriana, Floriana Lines
 Vladimir Fock, Russian physicist – Fock space, Fock state, Hartree-Fock method
 Marie Angélique de Scorailles, Duchess of Fontanges, French courtesan – fontange (a type of haircut)
 B.C. Forbes, Scottish-American journalist – Forbes magazine
 Henry Ford, American businessman – Ford Motor Company
 Matthias N. Forney, American inventor – Forney locomotive
 William Forsyth, Scottish botanist – Forsythia
 Charles Fort, American writer – Forteana, Fortean Society, Fortean Times
 Pim Fortuyn, Dutch politician – Fortuynism
 Dick Fosbury, American athlete – Fosbury flop
 Charles Fourier, French philosopher – Fourierism
 Charles James Fox, British politician – Foxite
 William Fox, American film producer – 20th Century Fox
 Francis of Assisi, French religious founder – San Francisco.
 Francisco Franco, Spanish general and president – Francoism
 Frankenstein's Monster, British literary character – Frankenstein (a monstrous creation that ruins its creator), Frankensteinian, frankenfood, Frankenstrat
 Benjamin Franklin, American inventor – Franklin stove, franklin, Ben Franklin effect. 
 Franz Joseph I of Austria, Austrian-Hungarian emperor – Franz Josef Land
 Célestin Freinet, French pedagogue – Freinet education, Freinet classification
 Augustin Fresnel, French engineer, physicist and inventor – Fresnel lens.
 Sigmund Freud, Austrian psychologist – Freudian, Freudian slip, Freudian psychology, Freudo-Marxism, Neo-Freudianism
 Robert Fripp, English musician – Frippertronics
 Friedrich Fröbel, German pedagogue – Froebel gifts, Fröbel school
 Fu Manchu, British literary character – Fu Manchu moustache
 Guido Fubini, Italian mathematician  – Fubini's theorem
 Leonhart Fuchs, German botanist – Fuchsia
 Alberto Fujimori, Peruvian president – Fujimorism
 Tetsuya "Ted" Fujita, Japanese meteorologist – Fujita scale
 J. William Fulbright, American politician – Fulbright scholarship
 Buckminster Fuller, American inventor – Fullerene

G 
 Gabriel, Biblical character – Gabriel's Horn.
 Johan Gadolin, Finnish chemist and geologist – gadolinite, the mineral after which the chemical element gadolinium has been named.
 Matilda Joslyn Gage, American activist – Matilda effect
 Thomas Gage, British botanist – greengage
 Gaget, French businessman – Gaget, Gauthier & Cie, gadget
 Hugh Gaitskell, British politician – Gaitskellism
 Uziel Gal, Israeli inventor – the Uzi submachine gun
 Galen, Greek physician – galenical.
 Galileo Galilei, Italian astronomer –  galileo or gal, unit of acceleration.
 Israel Galili, Israeli politician – the Galil assault rifle
 Rory Gallagher, Irish pop musician – Gallagher shirt.
 George Gallup, American businessman – Gallup poll
 Luigi Galvani, Italian physician – galvanization
 James Gamble and William Procter – Procter & Gamble
 Sarah Gamp, British literary character – gamp
 Mahatma Gandhi, Indian activist – Gandhism, Gandhian socialism, Gandhian economics, Gandhi cap
 Henry Laurence Gantt, American engineer – Gantt chart
 John Garand, Canadian-American inventor – M1 Garand rifle
 Alexander Garden, Scottish botanist – after whom the gardenia was named.
 Gargantua, French literary character – "gargantuan" (colossal, gigantic), Gargantua (solitaire)
 Giuseppe Garibaldi, Italian politician – Garibaldi biscuits, Italian aircraft carrier Giuseppe Garibaldi, Garibaldi shirt, Garibaldi (fish)
 Gideon Gartner, American businessman – Gartner
 Hermann Treschow Gartner, Danish surgeon and anatomist – Gartner's duct
 Marcus Garvey, Jamaican activist – Garveyism
 Martin Garzez, Maltese knight – Garzes Tower
 Béla Gáspár, Hungarian chemist - Gasparcolor
 Richard J. Gatling, American inventor – Gatling gun
 Charles de Gaulle, French general and president – Charles de Gaulle Airport, Gaullism
 Carl Friedrich Gauss, German mathematician – gauss – unit of magnetic induction, Gauss' law; see also: List of topics named after Carl Friedrich Gauss
 Enola Gay Tibbets, mother of Paul Tibbets, American pilot – Enola Gay
 Joseph Louis Gay-Lussac and Jacques Charles, French physicists and chemists – Law of Charles and Gay-Lussac
 Lou Gehrig, American baseball player – Lou Gehrig's disease
 Hans Geiger, German inventor – Geiger counter, Geiger–Müller tube
 Genius, Greek mythological character – genius, genie
 Gentius, Illyrian king – gentian
 George I, English king – Georgia (U.S. state)
 George V, British king – King George Street, King George Street, King George V Dock
 George VI, British king – George Cross, George Medal
 Henry George, American political economist – Georgism
 Saint George, Christian saint – Order of Saint George, Order of Saint Michael and Saint George, Saint George's Cross, Georgia, Saint George's, Grenada, and numerous other localities, churches and cathedrals
 Sophie Germain, French mathematician – Sophie Germain prime
 Hugo Gernsback, Luxembourgian-American publisher, inventor and writer – Hugo Award .
 Elbridge Gerry, American politician – gerrymandering
 Domingo Ghirardelli, American businessman – Ghirardelli Chocolate Company
 Gianduja, Italian theatrical character – Gianduja chocolate spread.
 Josiah Willard Gibbs, American chemist, mathematician and physicist – Gibbs free energy, Gibbs phenomenon
 Gideon, Biblical character – a "gideon".
 The Gigantes, Greek mythological characters – giant, gigantic
 Leonardo Gigli, Italian obstetrician – Gigli saw
 Saint Gilbert, English saint – Gilbertine
 Augustin Nicolas Gilbert, French physician – Gilbert's syndrome
 Thomas Gilbert, British sea captain – Kiribati.
 William S. Gilbert, British playwright – Gilbertian.
 Lillian Gilbreth, American Motion Studies expert – Therblig unit of movement (surname backwards more or less)
 King Camp Gillette, American inventor and businessman – Gillette
 Terry Gilliam, American animator and film director – Gilliamesque.
 Charles William Gilpin, American businessman – Gilpin Airlines
 William Gladstone, British Prime Minister – Gladstone bag, Gladstonian liberalism
 John Glas, Scottish religious leader – Glasite
 Johann Rudolf Glauber, German-Dutch chemist – Glauber's salt
 Gaston Glock, Austrian businessman and inventor – Glock and the Glock pistol
 Jehan Gobelin, French tapestry weaver – gobelin
 Kurt Gödel, Austrian-American mathematician – Gödel's incompleteness theorem, Gödel's ontological proof
 Godred Crovan, King of Dublin and the Isles – Crovan dynasty
 Mike Godwin, American writer – Godwin's law
 Godzilla, Japanese film monster – Godzilla roar (a soundbite which originated in the movies, but has become a recognizable stock sound effect on its own)
 Lamme Goedzak, Belgian literary character – "lamme goedzak" (Dutch expression to describe a "good, loveable, but naïve person, prone to being taken advantage of." The term is also used for obese, jolly people who enjoying eating and drinking.)
 Maria Goeppert-Mayer, Polish physicist – Goeppert-Mayer (GM) unit for the cross section of two-photon absorption
 Johann Wolfgang von Goethe, German poet, playwright, writer and scientist – Goethian, Goethite
 Marcel J.E. Golay, Swiss mathematician – Binary Golay code, Savitzky–Golay filter
 Rube Goldberg, American comics artist and cartoonist – Reuben Award, Rube Goldberg machine.
 Goldilocks, British fairy tale character – Goldilocks principle.
 Samuel Goldwyn, American film producer – Goldwyn Picture Corporation, later merged into Metro–Goldwyn–Mayer Inc. (or MGM), Goldwynism
 Goliath, Biblical character  – "goliath", Goliath frog, Goliath birdeater, Goliath shrew
 Golliwog, American literary character – golliwog, golliwog doll.
 Franciscus Gomarus, Dutch theologist – gomarism.
 Luis de Góngora y Argote, Spanish poet – Gongorism
 Goofy, American cartoon character – Goofy holler
 Gordias, Greek mythological king – Gordian knot
 Alexander Gordon, Scottish nobleman – Gordon setter
 Wilbert Gore, American businessman – Gore-Tex
 The Gorgons, Greek mythological characters – gorgonopsia, gorgonacea, gorgoneion
 Johannes Goropius Becanus, Dutch philosopher and physician – goropism
 Klement Gottwald, Czechoslovak politician – Zlín, a city in Moravia, the Czech Republic, was renamed Gottwaldov during 1949–1990.
 Regnier de Graaf, Dutch physician – Graafian follicle
 Thomas Gradgrind, British literary character – gradgrind
 Ernst Gräfenberg, German physician – Gräfenberg spot (G-spot)
 Sylvester Graham, American inventor – Graham crackers, Graham flour, Graham bread
 Thomas Graham, Scottish chemist – Graham's Law
 James Granger, British writer – grangerise
 Marcel Grateau, French hairdresser – Marcelling, a Marcel haircut.
 Robert James Graves, Irish surgeon – Graves–Basedow disease
 Louis Harold Gray, British physicist – gray, unit of absorbed dose of radiation
 Gregory I, Italian pope – Gregorian music
 Gregory XIII, Italian pope – Gregorian calendar
 Richard Grenville-Temple, 2nd Earl Temple, British politician – Grenvillite
 Thomas Gresham, English merchant – Gresham's Law
 Victor Grignard (1871–1935), French chemist – Grignard reagent and Grignard reaction
 Jacob and Wilhelm Grimm, German folklorists, storytellers and linguist – Grimm's law, Grimmification
 Henri Grob, Swiss chess player – Grob's Attack
 Homer Groening, father of Matt Groening, creator of The Simpsons – Homer Simpson, character in The Simpsons animated TV series
 Franz von Gruithuisen, Bavarian physician and astronomer - Gruithuisen's lunar city (a clair-obscur/ trompe l'oeil effect on the moon's surface, north of crater Schröter, created by partially sunlit formations which have a somewhat artificial look).
 Ernst Grünfeld, Austrian chess player – Grünfeld Defence
 Vicente Guerrero, Mexican general – Guerrero
 Ché Guevara, Argentine revolutionary leader – Guevarism
 Guido of Arezzo, Italian musicologist – Guidonian hand, GUIDO music notation.
 Georges Guillain, French physician – Guillain–Barré syndrome
 Dr. Joseph Ignace Guillotin, French inventor – guillotine
 Henry C. Gunning, Canadian geologist – gunningite
 Robert John Lechmere Guppy, British biologist – guppy or guppie
 Louis Guttman, American psychologist and mathematician – Guttman scale

H 
 Fritz Haber, German chemist – Haber process
 Hadrian, Roman emperor – Hadrian's Wall and Hadrian's Wall Path
 Amber Hagerman, American kidnapping and murder victim – AMBER Alert
 Otto Hahn, German physicist – hahnium, chemical element. This element name is not accepted by IUPAC (See element naming controversy)
 Wilhelm Karl Ritter von Haidinger, Austrian mineralogist - Haidinger's brush
 Edwin Hall, American physicist – Hall effect
 Monty Hall, Canadian TV presenter – Monty Hall problem
 Edmond Halley, British astronomer – Halley's Comet
 Hugh Halligan, American police officer – Halligan bar
 Haman, Biblical figure – Hamantash
 Alexander Hamilton, American politician – Hamiltonianism
 Laurens Hammond, American inventor – Hammond organ
 Hamo, a 6th-century Saxon settler and landowner – Hampshire
 John Hancock, American politician– Since he signed the American Declaration of Independence his name became an eponym for "signature" in the U.S.A.
 Elliot Handler and Harold "Matt" Matson, American businesspeople – Mattel
 William Hanna and Joseph Barbera, American animators – Hanna-Barbera
 Gerhard Armauer Hansen, Norwegian physician – Hansen's disease
 Joseph Aloysius Hansom, British inventor – Hansom cab
 William S. Harley and Arthur Davidson, American businesspeople – Harley-Davidson
 Fletcher Harper, American publisher – Harper's Weekly
 Rodney Harrington, British literary and TV character – Harrington jacket
 David Harris (protester) – David's Album
 Charles Henry Harrod, British businessman – Harrods
 Alexis Hartmann, American paediatrician – Hartmann's solution
 Douglas Hartree, British mathematician – Hartree energy, Hartree equation, Hartree–Fock method
 Gerry Harvey and Ian Norman, Australian businesspeople – Harvey Norman
 Hashimoto Hakaru, Japanese physician – Hashimoto's thyroiditis
 Hassan-i-Sabah Persian religious leader – Hashshashin, assassin from hassansin (this etymology is disputed)
 Victor Hasselblad, Swedish photographer – Hasselblad, medium format photographic camera system
 Hawaii-loa, Polynesian chief who first led settlers to Hawaii – Hawaii
 Stephen Hawking, British astronomer and mathematician – Hawking radiation
 Paul Hawkins, British mathematician – Hawk-Eye tracking system used in cricket and other sports.
 Sadie Hawkins, American comics character – Sadie Hawkins dance, Sadie Hawkins Day
 Howard Hawks, American film director – Hawksian woman.
 Frank Hawthorne, Canadian mineralogist – Frankhawthorneite
 Haxtur, Spanish comics character – Haxtur Award
 Friedrich Hayek, Austrian economist – Hayekian economics
 Leonard Hayflick, American anatomist – Hayflick limit
 Will H. Hays, American film censor – Hays Code
 Oliver Heaviside, British physicist, and Arthur Edwin Kennelly, American physicist– Kennelly–Heaviside layer
 Henry Heimlich, American physician – Heimlich Maneuver
 Gerard Adriaan Heineken, Dutch beer brewer – Heineken
 Jimi Hendrix, American rock singer and guitarist – Hendrix riff
 John Henry, American folkloric character – John Henryism
 Joseph Henry, American physicist – henry, unit of inductance
 William Henry, British chemist – Henry's law
 James Curtis Hepburn, American translator – Hepburn romanization
 Herblock, American newspaper cartoonist – Herblock Prize
 Hercules, Greek mythological character – Herculean task
 Hergé, Belgian comics artist – "Hergéan" (comics in Hergé's graphic style, usually meaning the ligne claire)
 Milton S. Hershey, American businessman – Hershey Company
 Heinrich Rudolf Hertz, German physicist – hertz, unit of frequency
 Ejnar Hertzsprung, Danish astronomer, and Henry Norris Russell, American astronomer – Hertzsprung–Russell diagram
 Theodor Herzl, Austro-Hungarian journalist and writer – Mount Herzl
 William Hewlett and David Packard, American businessmen – Hewlett-Packard
 Edward C. Heyde, American physician – Heyde's syndrome
 Miguel Hidalgo, Mexican priest and military leader – Hidalgo (state), Ciudad Hidalgo (Michoacán), Ciudad Hidalgo (Chiapas), Hidalgo (Texas).
 David Hilbert, German mathematician and physicist – Hilbert's program
 Paul von Hindenburg, German general and politician – Hindenburg airship
 Eugen von Hippel, German physician, and Arvid Lindau, Swedish physician – Von Hippel–Lindau disease
 Hippocrates, Greek physician – Hippocratic Oath
 Harald Hirschsprung, Danish physician – Hirschsprung's disease
 Alfred Hitchcock, British film director – Hitchcockian suspense, Hitchcock cameos (often used to refer to any cameo by a creator in his own work)
 Adolf Hitler, Austrian-German dictator – Hitlerite, Hitler salute, Hitler moustache, Hitlerjugend, Hitlerism
 Thomas Hobbes, 17th century philosopher – Hobbes from "Calvin and Hobbes" comic strip
 Thomas Hobson, British stable manager and carrier– Hobson's choice
 Thomas Hodgkin, British physician – Hodgkin's disease, non-Hodgkin's lymphoma
 William Hogarth, British painter, illustrator and cartoonist – Hogarthian
 Sherlock Holmes, British literary character – a "sherlock" (anyone who solves a mystery or a difficult problem. Sometimes also used in a sarcastic context, when something obvious has been pointed out.), Sherlockian game, a Sherlock Holmes hat (nickname for a deerstalker)
 Soichiro Honda, Japanese businessman – Honda
 Mark Honeywell, American businessman – Honeywell
 Robin Hood, English folk hero – Robin Hood effect, Robin Hood Foundation, Robin Hood Flour, Robin Hood Hills, Robin Hood hat, Robin Hood index, Robin Hood Gardens, Robin Hood plan, Robin Hood tax, Robin Hood test, Robin Hood character (someone who steals money to give it to the poor or a criminal who becomes a folk hero), Robin of the Batman series
 Robert Hooke, British physicist – Hooke's law
 William Henry Hoover, American business man – The Hoover Company; in British English, the verb "hoover" means "to vacuum a floor" while the noun is the vacuum cleaner.  The word "hoover" has also come to mean anything that is sucked up at a great rate ("They hoovered their way through the banquet")
 August Horch, German businessman – Horch and Audi carmakers (audi is Latin for I listen; horch has the same meaning in old German)
 Leslie Hore-Belisha, British politician – Belisha beacon
 James Horlick and William Horlick, British-American business people – Horlicks
 Shemp Howard, American actor and comedian – Fake Shemp
 William Howe, American architect and engineer – Howe truss bridges
 Enver Hoxha, Albanian president – Hoxhaism
 Hroc, an ancient landowner ("Hroc's fortress" + shire) – Roxburghshire
 Edwin Hubble, American astronomer – Hubble Space Telescope
 Henry Hudson, British explorer – Hudson Bay, Hudson River, Hudson Strait
 Howard Hughes, American aviator and businessman – Hughes Aircraft company, Howard Hughes Medical Institute, Hughes Airwest airlines, Hughes Glomar Explorer ship
 Howard R. Hughes Sr., American businessman – Hughes Tool Company, Baker Hughes company
 Alexander von Humboldt, German explorer – Humboldt Bay, Humboldt Current, Humboldt Falls, Humboldt Glacier, Humboldt lily, Humboldt Peak, Humboldt penguin, Humboldt Range, Humboldt River, Humboldt Sink, Humboldt squid, Pico Humboldt, Humboldt University of Berlin, Humboldt State University, Humboldtian science, Humboldt's hog-nosed skunk
 Gustáv Husák, Czechoslovakian president – Husakism, Husák's Children
 John Huss, Czech priest – Hussites, Czechoslovak Hussite Church
 Hypnos, Greek mythological character – hypnosis.

I 
 Icarus, Greek mythological character – Icarus paradox
 Ignatz Mouse – American comics character – Ignatz Award
 Max Immelmann, German aviator – Immelmann turn, Immelmann loop
 Éleuthère Irénée du Pont, French-American businessman – DuPont
 Iris, Greek mythological character – Iris (anatomy)
 Otto Isakower, Austrian-American psychiatrist - Isakower phenomenon
 Italus, Roman/Greek mythological character – Italy.
 Iustitia, Roman mythological character – justice.

J 
 Andrew Jackson, American president – Jacksonian democracy
 Jacob (also known as Israel), Biblical character – Israel, Jacob's ladder (electricity), Jacob's ladder (knife), Jacob's ladder (manifold), Jacob's ladder (nautical), Jacob's Ladder (ropes course), Jacob's ladder (toy), Jacob's Ladder (piercing)
 Joseph Marie Jacquard, French inventor – Jacquard loom
 Candido Jacuzzi, Italian inventor – jacuzzi
 Gustav Jäger, German naturalist – Jaeger
 Maharajah Jai Singh, Indian maharajah – Jaipur
 Alfons Maria Jakob and Hans Gerhard Creutzfeldt, German physicians – Creutzfeldt–Jakob disease
 Saint James, Christian martyr – Santiago de Compostela, Santiago de Chile, Jacobin, in several languages (like French, German and Dutch) the word scallop is referred to as a "mussel/clam/shell/cockle of St. James".
 Thomas James, British-Welsh explorer – James Bay
 James, Duke of York, English king – New York City, New York State
 Calamity Jane, nickname of Martha Jane Canary, American frontierswoman and professional scout – Calamity James
 Cornelius Jansen, Flemish-Dutch theologian – Jansenism
 Karl Jansky, American astronomer – jansky, unit of flux density.
 Janus, Roman mythological character – January
 Robert Jarvik, American inventor – Jarvik artificial heart
 Javan, biblical character – Ionians
 Thomas Jefferson, American president – Jeffersonian, relating to Thomas Jefferson; more specifically, Jeffersonian architecture, Jeffersonian democracy; also, Jefferson Bible
 Jehovah , Biblical Deity – Jehovah's Witnesses
 Dr. Jekyll and Mr. Hyde, British literary character – a "Dr. Jekyll and Mr. Hyde" personality is used to describe a split personality
 Georges Jenny, French musician, poet, and electronic instrument builder — Jenny Ondioline
 Jeremiah, Biblical prophet – jeremiad
 Jeroboam, Israelian king – Jeroboam wine bottle
 Jessica Lunsford, American rape and murder victim – Jessica's Law
 Jiggs, American comics character – Jiggs dinner
 John of Austria, Austrian field marshal – Johannite
 John the Baptist, Biblical character – Order of Saint John, San Ġwann
 Tommy John, American baseball player – Tommy John surgery
 Jonah, Biblical character – Turkish yunus baligi (Jonas fish) for dolphins; Jonah, a sailor who brings bad luck
 The Joneses, American comics characters from Arthur R. "Pop" Momand's comic strip Keeping up with the Joneses – The idiom keeping up with the Joneses.
 Barry Jones, Australian activist and politician – Barry Jones Bay, Yalkaparidon jonesi.
 Edward Jones and Charles Dow, American businesspeople – Dow Jones & Company
 Joseph II, Austrian-Hungarian emperor – Josephinism
 Brian David Josephson, Welsh physicist – Josephson junction, Josephson effect
 James Prescott Joule, British physicist – joule
 Judah, Biblical character (Hebrew: יהודה, Yehuda) – Bnei Yehuda Tel Aviv F.C., Kingdom of Judah
 Judas Iscariot, Biblical character – Judas
 Julian the Hospitaller, Christian martyr – St. Julian's, St. Julian's Tower, various locations named "San Julián"
 Julius of Caerleon, Christian martyr – St Julians, Newport
 Juno, Roman mythological character – June
 Jupiter, Roman mythological character – jovial, jovian, Jovian system
 Justinian I, Byzantine king – Codex Justinianeus

K 
 János Kádár, Hungarian president – Kadarism
 Franz Kafka, Czech-German author – Kafkaesque
 Meir Kahane, American-Israeli activist – Kahanism
 Mikhail Kalashnikov, Russian gun inventor – the Avtomat Kalashnikova series of weapons, including the AK-47, the Kalashnikov Handheld Machine Gun or Ruchnoi Pulemet Kalashnikova obraztsa 1974 g (RPK-74)
 Ingvar Kamprad, Swedish businessman – the first two letters of IKEA
 Victor Kandinsky, Russian physician – Kandinsky–Clérambault syndrome
 Gaetano Kanizsa, Italian psychologist – Kanizsa triangle
 Megan Kanka, American rape and murder victim – Megan's Law
 Moritz Kaposi, Hungarian dermatologist – Kaposi's sarcoma
 D. R. Kaprekar, Indian mathematician – Kaprekar constant, Kaprekar number
 Jacobus Kapteyn, Dutch astronomer – Kapteyn's Star
 Anna Karenina, Russian literary character – Anna Karenina principle
 Theodore von Kármán, Hungarian mathematician – Kármán line, von Kármán constant, von Kármán ogive, Kármán vortex street
 Tadao Kashio, Japanese businessman – Casio
 Yevgeny Kaspersky, Russian computer scientist and businessman – Kaspersky Lab, Kaspersky Anti-Virus
 Túpac Katari, Bolivian resistance leader – Katarismo
 Shozo Kawasaki, Japanese businessman – Kawasaki Heavy Industries
 Tomisaku Kawasaki, Japanese physician – Kawasaki disease
 Ryan Keenan, Amy Barger, Lennox Cowie, astronomers - KBC Void (Keenan-Barger-Cowie Void, an immense empty region of space)
 Grace Kelly, American actress – Kelly bag
 Lord Kelvin, Irish-British phycist – kelvin (unit of thermodynamic temperature)
 John F. Kennedy, American president – John F. Kennedy International Airport, John F. Kennedy Center for the Performing Arts, Kennedy Center Honors, John F. Kennedy University, Kennedy Doctrine
 Arthur E. Kennelly, American physicist, and Oliver Heaviside, British physicist – Kennelly–Heaviside layer
 Johannes Kepler, German astronomer – Kepler's laws of planetary motion, Kepler conjecture
 Paul Keres, Estonian chess player – Keres Defence
 H. F. A. Kern, Dutch observer of sky phenomena - Kern arc (a very rare halo phenomenon, probably the complete annular appearance of the Circumzenithal arc)
 Brian Kernighan, Canadian computer scientist – the third letter of the name AWK, a computer pattern/action language, is taken from his last name.
 John Kerr, Scottish physicist – Kerr effect
 John Maynard Keynes, British economist – Keynesian economics
 Nikita Khrushchev, Russian head of state – Khrushchevism, Khrushchev dough, Khrushchyovka
 Wilhelm Killing, German mathematician – Killing vector field
 Petrus Jacobus Kipp, Dutch chemist – Kipp apparatus
 Jack Kirby, American comics artist – Kirby dots
 Gustav Kirchhoff, German physicist – Kirchhoff's Laws
 Néstor Kirchner, Argentine president – Kirchnerism
 Herbert Kitchener, 1st Earl Kitchener, British general – Kitchener bun
 Lawrence Klein, American curator – Klein Award
 Sebastian Kneipp, German priest – Kneipp cure.
 Diedrich Knickerbocker, American literary character – knickerbockers
 Donald Knuth, American computer scientist – Knuth–Morris–Pratt algorithm
 Ed Koch, American politician – Ed Koch Queensboro Bridge
 Helge von Koch, Swedish mathematician – Koch snowflake.
 Robert Koch, German physician – Koch's postulates
 Ludwig Ritter von Köchel, Austrian musicologist – Köchel catalogue, K-numbers.
 Zoltán Kodály, Hungarian composer – Kodály method
 Simon bar Kokhba, Jewish resistance leader – Bar Kokhba game (Hungarian game)
 Alexander Konstantinopolsky, Ukrainian-Russian chess player – Konstantinopolsky Opening
 Abraham Isaac Kook, Russian rabbi – Mossad Harav Kook
 Wladimir Köppen, Russian-German meteorologist – Köppen climate classification
 Kazimierz Kordylewski, Polish astronomer - Kordylewski cloud
 Sergei Korsakoff, Russian psychologist – Korsakoff's syndrome
 Aharon Kotler, Belarusian rabbi – Ramat Aharon
 Alfried Krupp, German businessman – Krupp, now ThyssenKrupp
 Gerard Kuiper, Dutch astronomer – Kuiper belt
 August Kundt, German physicist – Kundt's tube
 Harvey Kurtzman, American comics artist – Harvey Award
 Kyi, Kyivan legendary founder – Kyiv

See also 
 Lists of etymologies
 List of eponymous adjectives in English
 List of eponymous laws
 List of places named after people
 List of astronomical objects named after people
 List of stars named after people
 List of toponyms

Sources 

Eponyms